Robert William Ainsworth (born 19 June 1952) is a British Labour Party politician who was the Member of Parliament (MP) for Coventry North East from 1992 to 2015, and was the Secretary of State for Defence from 2009 to 2010. Following the general election in 2010 he was the Shadow Defence Secretary, but was replaced by Jim Murphy following the election of Labour leader Ed Miliband.

Early life
Ainsworth was born in Coventry on 19 June 1952, and attended the local Foxford Comprehensive School. From 1971 to 1991, he was a sheet metal worker and fitter at Jaguar. He first became active in politics as a trade unionist at the Jaguar Cars plant in Coventry where he worked and served in many union capacities, including as Branch President (in what was later to become part of the Manufacturing, Science and Finance union). In 1984, he was elected to Coventry City Council, became Chair of the Finance Committee, and was deputy leader of the ruling Labour group. He was also Constituency Labour Party chairman.

Parliamentary career
Ainsworth tried to become Labour candidate for Coventry North East in the run-up to the 1987 general election, after George Park MP announced his retirement, but only came third at the selection meeting, behind John Hughes and Ted Knight. In the run-up to the 1992 general election, Hughes was de-selected by the Constituency Labour Party, and Ainsworth became the candidate. He was elected with an 11,676 majority, and stepped down from the city council the following year. At the 1997 general election his majority rose sharply to 22,569, falling back to 15,751 at the 2001 election, and 14,222 at the 2005 election.

On 7 December 2012, Ainsworth announced his intention not to stand at the 2015 United Kingdom general election.

In Government
Ainsworth was appointed a Labour whip in 1995 and served in government until January 2001 when he was promoted to Parliamentary Under Secretary of State at the former Department for Environment, Transport and the Regions. After the 2001 general election, Ainsworth was moved to the Home Office as Parliamentary Under-Secretary with responsibility for Drugs and Organised Crime, where he remained until 2003, when he became the Deputy Chief Whip (also known as the Treasurer of the Household). He was appointed to the Privy Council in February 2005. On 29 June 2007, he moved to become the Minister of State for the Armed Forces.

Defence Secretary
On 5 June 2009, he was appointed to the cabinet by Gordon Brown as Secretary of State for Defence, in what was considered by some to be "a surprise choice". As Defence Secretary, Ainsworth declared in July 2009 that "the government should have offered more support to British troops at the beginning of the wars in Afghanistan and Iraq."

At the Labour Party Conference in Brighton in 2009, Ainsworth stated that sending reinforcements to Afghanistan may not be possible because of a lack of necessary military resources. He said, "Before I agree to any increase in troop numbers I must be sure that the balance of risk is acceptable by evaluating the capacity of the supply chain to properly equip the increased force."

Expenses
In the 2009 Parliamentary expenses scandal, in which a number of MPs were criticised for their expense claims, it was revealed that, in 2007–08, Ainsworth had claimed the maximum permissible amount of £23,083 for second-home allowances, making him the joint highest claimant that year with 142 other MPs. For 2008–09, he claimed £20,304, 269th out of 647 MPs.

Legalisation of drugs
Ainsworth launched the Home Office's "Safer Clubbing" guide in 2002 which provided guidance to nightclub owners on harm reduction relating to recreational drug use.

In December 2010, Ainsworth called for the legalisation and regulation of drugs, arguing it is better for addicts to receive their fixes on prescription rather than relying for their supply on the international criminal gangs that make billions of pounds from the trade. As a Home Office minister, Ainsworth was responsible for drugs policy.

Personal life
In 1974, Ainsworth married Gloria. Together they have two daughters.

In May 2019, Ainsworth revealed that he had voted for the Green Party in that month's European Parliament election. He called it an "I'm Spartacus" moment, stating: "I voted Green in the Euro elections having never voted other than Labour before in my entire life. I didn't intend to make this public, but now Alastair has been expelled for doing the same I feel obliged to do so." This was in reference to the expulsion of Alastair Campbell for revealing that he had voted for the Liberal Democrats at the same election.

References

External links
Bob Ainsworth Constituency Website
Coventry Labour Party
Bob Ainsworth Twitter Page

|-

|-

|-

|-

|-

1952 births
Living people
Coventry City Councillors
British drug policy reform activists
Labour Party (UK) MPs for English constituencies
Members of the Privy Council of the United Kingdom
Treasurers of the Household
UK MPs 1992–1997
UK MPs 1997–2001
UK MPs 2001–2005
UK MPs 2005–2010
UK MPs 2010–2015
Secretaries of State for Defence (UK)
Trade unionists from Warwickshire